Sarah Todd Astor, wife of John Jacob Astor I
 Charlotte Augusta Gibbes Astor, wife of John Jacob Astor III
Madeleine Talmage Force, wife of John Jacob Astor IV